Die Hochzeit von Länneken is an East German film. It was released in 1964.

External links
 

1964 films
East German films
1960s German-language films
Films directed by Heiner Carow
Films about fishing
Films set in the Baltic Sea
1960s German films